Following is a list of notable Black-owned restaurants, sorted by location (of headquarters in cases of chains):

South Africa
 Mzoli's – Gugulethu

United States

Arkansas
 Jones Bar-B-Q Diner – Marianna

California
 Blaze Pizza – Pasadena
 Souley Vegan – Oakland

Georgia
 Slutty Vegan – Atlanta

North Carolina
 Saltbox Seafood Joint – Durham

Oregon
 Akadi – Portland
 Amalfi's Italian Restaurant – Portland
 Assembly Brewing – Portland
 Atlas Pizza – Portland
 Deadstock Coffee – Portland
 Dirty Lettuce – Portland
 Erica's Soul Food – Portland
 Everybody Eats PDX – Portland
 Joe Brown's Carmel Corn – Portland
 Kee's Loaded Kitchen – Portland
 Nacheaux – West Linn (previously Portland)
 Olive or Twist – Portland
 Queen of Sheba – Portland
 Reo's Ribs – Portland
 Santé Bar – Portland
 Viking Soul Food – Portland

Tennessee
 Prince's Hot Chicken Shack – Nashville

Texas
 Frenchy's Chicken – Houston

Washington
 Boon Boona Coffee
 Cafe Campagne – Seattle
 Communion Restaurant and Bar – Seattle
 Ezell's Chicken – Seattle
 The Original Philly's – Seattle
 Osteria la Spiga – Seattle
 Plum Bistro – Seattle

References

Black-owned restaurants
Lists of restaurants